Hamelieae is a tribe of flowering plants in the family Rubiaceae and contains about 171 species in 6 genera. Its representatives are found in tropical and subtropical America. The sister tribe Hillieae is  sometimes here included.

Genera 
Currently accepted names

 Chione DC. (1 sp)
 Cosmocalyx Standl. (1 sp)
 Deppea Schltdl. & Cham. (35 sp)
 Hamelia Jacq. (17 sp)
 Hoffmannia Sw. (115 sp)
 Omiltemia Standl. (2 sp)

Synonyms

 Campylobotrys Lem. = Hoffmannia
 Choristes Benth. = Deppea
 Crusea A.Rich. = Chione
 Duhamelia Pers. = Hamelia
 Euosmia Humb. & Bonpl. = Hoffmannia
 Evosmia Kunth = Hoffmannia
 Higginsia Pers. = Hoffmannia
 Koehneago Kuntze = Hoffmannia
 Lonicera Adans. = Hamelia
 Ohigginsia Ruiz & Pav. = Hoffmannia
 Ophryococcus Oerst. = Hoffmannia
 Oregandra Standl. = Chione
 Sacconia Endl. = Chione
 Schenckia K.Schum. = Deppea
 Tangaraca Adans. = Hamelia
 Tepesia C.F.Gaertn. = Hamelia
 Xerococcus Oerst. = Hoffmannia

References 

 
Cinchonoideae tribes